The Diocese of Saint-Claude (Latin: Dioecesis Sancti Claudii; French: Diocèse de Saint-Claude) is a Latin Church ecclesiastical territory or diocese of the Catholic Church in France. The diocese corresponds in territory to the department of Jura. It was created in 1742, as a smaller area, mostly consisting of some parishes previously controlled by the Abbey of Saint-Claude. Under the Concordat of 1802 the diocese was suppressed and its territory included in the Archdiocese of Besançon; in 1822 it was again made an independent diocese. 

The Diocese of Saint-Claude is a suffragan diocese in the ecclesiastical province of the metropolitan Archdiocese of Besançon, and formerly a suffragan of the Archdiocese of Lyon. Its cathedra is Saint-Claude Cathedral, in the episcopal see of Saint-Claude, Jura.

Bishops

Joseph de Méallet de Fargues, 1742–1785
Jean-Baptiste Chabot, 1785–1801
François Xavier Moyse (François-Xavier Moïse), 1791–1793, constitutional bishop
Vacant
Antoine Jacques de Chamon, 1823–1851
Jean Pierre Mabile, 1851–1858, also Bishop of Versailles
Charles Jean Fillion, 1858–1862, also Bishop of Le Mans
Louis Anne Nogret, 1862–1880
César-Joseph Marpot, 1880–1898
François-Alexandre Maillet, 1898–1925
Rambert-Irénée Faure, 1926–1948
Claude-Constant Marie Flusin, 1948–1975
Gilbert-Antoine Duchêne, 1975–1994
Yves François Patenôtre, 1994–2004, also Archbishop of Sens
Jean-Marie-Henri Legrez, O.P., 2005–2011; named Archbishop of Albi on February 2, 2011
Vincent Jordy, 2011–2019
Jean-Luc Gérard Garin, 2020–present

See also
Catholic Church in France
List of Catholic dioceses in France

References

External links
  Centre national des Archives de l'Église de France, L’Épiscopat francais depuis 1919, retrieved: 2016-12-24.
 Diocesan page

Saint-Claude
Religious organizations established in 1742
Dioceses established in the 18th century
1742 establishments in France